Radio City 97.5 (DWNG 97.5 MHz) is an FM station in the Philippines owned by Southern Tagalog Sweet Life and operated by DCG Radio-TV Network. Its studios and transmitter are located at 1022 DCG Tower 1, Maharlika Hi-Way, Brgy. Isabang, Tayabas.

History
January 5, 1997 - Big Sound FM was inaugurated. It was formerly owned by Vanguard Radio Network.
September 14, 2014 - Big Sound FM went off the air for the last time. Southern Tagalog Sweet Life acquired the station.
September 22, 2014 - Radio City was relaunched. It was formerly on 105.3.

References

External links
Radio City FB Page

Radio stations in Lucena, Philippines
Radio stations established in 1997